Steeve Falgayrettes is a French Guianan professional football manager.

Career
In 2011 and 2012 he coached the French Guiana national football team.

References

External links
Profile at Soccerway.com
Profile at Soccerpunter.com

Place of birth missing (living people)
Living people
French football managers
French Guianan football managers
French Guiana national football team managers
Year of birth missing (living people)